The en passant capture is a chess move.

En passant may also refer to:

 Coup en passant, a technique in the card game bridge
 En Passant (Alphawezen album), 2004
 En passant (Jean-Jacques Goldman album)

See also 
 Passant (disambiguation)